Maoping is a town under the administration of Yang County, Shaanxi, China. , it has 6 villages under its administration.

References 

Township-level divisions of Shaanxi
Yang County